The Copper River Highway extends  from Cordova along the old railbed of the Copper River and Northwestern Railway. Construction began in 1945, and was originally intended to link Cordova with the state highway system at Chitina. The Million Dollar Bridge, which had carried trains until the CR&NW shut down, was converted for highway use. It is one of two discontinuous segments of Alaska Route 10.

The road extended only slightly beyond the bridge when the Good Friday earthquake of 1964 halted construction and severely damaged the Million Dollar Bridge, collapsing the north span. Temporary repairs were made, and the bridge continued to be used. Permanent repairs were not completed until 2005.

The first  of the highway is paved; the rest is gravel. A primitive four-wheel-drive road continues for  beyond the end of the highway to the Allen River.

The highway past mile 36 has been de facto abandoned since 2011 due to erosion of the approach to Bridge 339.

Route description
The Copper River Highway begins at the Alaska Marine Highway ferry terminal in Cordova. From there, the highway proceeds through central Cordova, intersecting several small roads and passing residential and commercial buildings. The road exits Cordova, and passes the large Eyak Lake, proceeding to the Merle K. (Mudhole) Smith Airport. The highway proceeds through Chugach National Forest, and passes over the Copper River, and several small sloughs. The roadway continues north, passing through several miles of Chugach National Forest, before reaching the Million Dollar Bridge, the highway's northern terminus.

Major junctions

References

Cordova, Alaska
State highways in Alaska